Lauren Bercovitch (born September 29, 1984) is a Vancouver-based Canadian producer, whose most recent film, A Brony Tale, was released in North American theaters July 2014.

Career
After production managing at Adbusters Media Foundation for five years, Bercovitch story produced the Leo-award-winning Anna & Kristina’s Grocery Bag, which was also nominated for a Gemini Award. In 2014, Bercovitch produced the TV movie Anna & Kristina: Cooked and was a producer on Brent Hodge's A Brony Tale, a documentary about the bronies, the teenage and adult fans of the television show My Little Pony: Friendship is Magic. A Brony Tale had its world premiere at the 2014 Tribeca Film Festival and was met with critical acclaim.

Bercovitch is also head of production at Kelly&Kelly, a podcasting studio founded in 2016 and based in Vancouver in British Columbia, Canada.

Filmography

References

External links
Official website
 

1984 births
Living people